Othman Almulla (born July 9, 1986) is the first Saudi professional golfer, and was the first Saudi Arabian and youngest Arab amateur golfer to qualify and play in the Dubai Desert Classic, a major PGA European Tour event that was held February 1–4, 2007 at the Emirates Golf Club, Dubai, U.A.E.

Biography
After winning the Qatar Open in January 2008, Almulla qualified to play in the PGA European Tour's Commercialbank Qatar Masters January 24–27, 2008 in Doha, Qatar.

Almulla also won the 2008 Saudi Aramco Invitational held at Aramco's Rolling Hills Golf Club in Dhahran, Saudi Arabia on Nov. 7, 2008, becoming the first Saudi national ever to win this tournament long dominated by Bahrainis.

He was also the youngest golfer to win the Pan Arab Amateur Golf Tournament, at age 21.

The child of a Saudi Aramco employee, Almulla was raised inside the Aramco residential camp at Dhahran and learned to play golf at Aramco's Rolling Hills Golf Club.

Team appearances
Amateur
Eisenhower Trophy (representing Saudi Arabia): 2006, 2008, 2018

References

External links
http://www.arabnews.com/?page=8&section=0&article=114036&d=8&m=11&y=2008

http://golfinvestors.com/news/view_news_detail.php?id=30418

http://www.dubaidesertclassic.com/print.php?sid=248

http://www.qatar-masters.com/news_detailed.php?newsid=85

http://www.ugagolf.com/news/ugaSubNews.asp?news_id=1261

http://www.arabnews.com/?page=8&section=0&article=98298&d=9&m=7&y=2007

http://www.arabnews.com/?page=8&section=0&article=106094&d=26&m=1&y=2008

http://www.othmanalmulla.com/

http://www.gulf-times.com/site/topics/article.asp?cu_no=2&item_no=194082&version=1&template_id=49&parent_id=29

http://www.sportsnetwork.com/merge/tsnform.aspx?c=sportsnetwork&page=golf-m/stat/GL_playerBio.aspx?PlayerID=6595,

http://sport.asiayouthmedia.com/golf/european/players/Othman+Al+Mulla/8980

https://sports.yahoo.com/golf/european/players/Othman+Al+Mulla/8980

http://golfinvestors.com/players/profile.php?id=10121&type=results

http://www.77d.com

Saudi Arabian male golfers
Amateur golfers
Place of birth missing (living people)
1986 births
Living people